Dithymoquinone is a bioactive isolate of Nigella sativa.  Chemically, it is a dimer of thymoquinone.

References

Quinones
Dimers (chemistry)
Biphenylenes
Tetraones
Isopropyl compounds
Cyclobutanes
Enones